Arthanareesa Varma was an Indian freedom fighter, poet, author and journalist. He is known for his prominent role in Vanniyar politics.

Early life 
Varma was born to  Sugavana Padayatchi  and Lakshmi Ammal on 27 July 1874 at Salem in Tamil Nadu.

Biography 
In 1911, Varma worked as manager of a publishing house called “Swadesh Abimani”. He was impressed by the poems of Subramania Bharatiyar. In 1931, Varma himself published a journal called “Veera Bharathi” and was its editor. The aim of the journal was to spread the news of freedom movement and its activities throughout India.
He is the friend of Indian freedom fighter Thiru. R.R. Chinna RamaGounder.
The British government brought amendment to the Journals Regulation Act to ban news journal support of the Indian freedom movement. Varma's "Veerabharathi" was also banned by the British government.

He was the only poet to write verse elegy on Subramania Bharati's death.

Varma played a prominent role in Vanniyar politics. He was considered as stalwart of Vanniyar politics.

Death 
Varma died at Tiruvannamalai on 7 December 1964.

Works

Journals 

 Kshatriyan
 Kshathriya Sigamani
 Tamil Mannan
 Sri Vanni Vamsa Pirakasikai
Vanniyakula Mitran
Viraparati

References 

Indian independence activists from Tamil Nadu
Indian independence movement
Poets from Tamil Nadu
Indian male poets
20th-century Indian poets
Writers from Tamil Nadu
20th-century Indian male writers
1874 births
1964 deaths
Writers in British India